Edappatta  is a village in Malappuram district in the state of Kerala, India.

Location
Edappatta is located between Nilambur and Perinthalmanna in Malappuram District. Nearest Airport is Calicut Airport which is about 50km. Nearest Railway station is Melattur at about 3km.

Demographics
 India census, Edappatta had a population of 20321 with 9787 males and 10534 females.

Important Landmarks
 Darul Uloom Madhrassa
 Veliyanchery Highschool
 St.Mary's Church, Pathirikode
 Olipuzha River

Major Places
 MOONADI 
 Veliyanchery
 Olappara
 Kizhakkumpadam
 Pullikkuth
 Pathirikode
 Edappatta Central
 Edappatta Puzhakkal Kund
 Eppikkadu
 Angilangadi

Transportation
Edappatta village connects to other parts of India through Perinthalmanna town.  National highway No.66 passes through Tirur and the northern stretch connects to Goa and Mumbai.  The southern stretch connects to Cochin and Trivandrum.   Highway No.966 goes to Palakkad and Coimbatore.   The nearest airport is at Kozhikode.  The nearest major railway station is at Tirur.

External links
 Edappatta online

References

Villages in Malappuram district
Perinthalmanna area